The aquatics discipline of swimming has been the core component of every edition of the FINA World Aquatics Championships since its introduction in 1973. In 1991, open water swimming events were introduced to the program of the World Championships.

Championships

Future championships

Events
The number of events competed for at each edition of the championships has grown steadily through the years. In 1973, 29 events were swum: 15 for men and 14 for women, all in the pool. Since 2015, the combined number of events for men and women including pool and open water events has been 49, a drastic increase compared to the first edition. Historically, 50 different events have been held across the 17 editions of the championships.

Long course
Long course events have been competed since the inaugural edition of the championships in 1973. The youngest male swimmer to participate in the World Swimming Championships was Ahnt Khaung Htut from Myanmar, who was 12 years old in 2015. He took part at the 100m backstroke and 100m breaststroke events. The youngest female swimmer to participate in the World Swimming Championships was 10-year-old Alzain Tareq from Bahrain in 2015. She participated at the 50m butterfly and 50m freestyle events.

Men's events

Women's events

Mixed events

Open water
Open water swimming events have been competed since the sixth edition of the championships in 1991. From 2000 to 2010, FINA organized in even years specific championships for open water swimming events, the FINA World Open Water Swimming Championships.

Events

Medalists
A select number of athletes have won medals at both long course and open water events, including Oussama Mellouli from Tunisia, Hayley Lewis from Australia, Gregorio Paltrinieri from Italy, Florian Wellbrock from Germany, and Sharon van Rouwendaal from the Netherlands. For a full list of medalists covering all editions of the championships see List of World Aquatics Championships medalists in swimming (men) and List of World Aquatics Championships medalists in swimming (women). For a complete list of medal winners in open water swimming see List of World Aquatics Championships medalists in open water swimming.

All-time medal table 1973–2022
Updated after the 2022 World Aquatics Championships.

Swimming

Record by number of gold medals –   (23 gold medals, 1978)
Record by number of total medals –   (49 medals in total, 2022)

Open water swimming

Multiple medalists

Boldface denotes active swimmers and highest medal count among all swimmers (including these who not included in these tables) per type.

All events

* including one medal in the relay event in which this swimmer participated in the heats only  
** including two medals in the relay events in which this swimmer participated in the heats only

Individual events

World records
The World Championships have often been the occasion at which elite swimmers reach the peak of their season, and hence numerous world records are often broken.

See also
List of World Championships records in swimming
Major achievements in swimming by nation
Swimming at the Summer Olympics

References

External links
FINA Official Championship Results History – Swimming (men)
FINA Official Championship Results History – Swimming (women)

 
FINA World Aquatics Championships
FINA World Swimming Championships
World Aquatics Championships